Pulianthope  was initially known as "Medicine Warehouse" for Englishmen, so it was called "Marunthukedangu"  and now it has changed to Pulianthope. From the days of Englishmen this place was very developed area in North Chennai. Also, it was surrounded with "Binny Mills" which was the biggest garment export factory, Basin bridge railway station, Chennai's biggest cattle slaughter house and meat supplier hub called "Aadudhotti". 

Also, Pulianthope is well known for playing Carrom and football, and many talents  came from Pulianthope.

This place also serves as headquarters for the political party annaithu makal katchi(Tamil for all peoples party).

Location

Pulianthope is located near  Pattalam, Otteri and Choolai.

Surroundings

References

Neighbourhoods in Chennai